Juan Baena Ruiz (18 May 1950 – 28 September 2012) was a Spanish footballer who played as a central defender.

Born in Cueta, Baena began playing football in the Real Betis youth system. He made his debut with the senior side during the 1969–70 Segunda División season before going on loan to CD Logroñés. Next, he joined Hércules CF, where he helped the club gain promotion to La Liga. Manager Arsenio Iglesias moved Baena from forward to midfield and then to defense, where he excelled. In total, Baena made 224 La Liga appearances for Hércules.

References

External links
 

1950 births
2012 deaths
People from Ceuta
Spanish footballers
Footballers from Ceuta
Association football defenders
La Liga players
Segunda División players
Tercera División players
Real Betis players
CD Logroñés footballers
Hércules CF players